Morlancourt is a commune in the Somme department in Hauts-de-France in northern France.

Geography

Population

Notable people
 Louis Friant (1758–1829), French military officer, born in Morlancourt.
 Manfred von Richthofen (1892-1918), German World War I fighter ace known as the Red Baron, died in action at Morlancourt.

See also
Communes of the Somme department

References

Communes of Somme (department)